The 1998 Notre Dame Fighting Irish football team represented the University of Notre Dame in the 1998 NCAA Division I-A football season. The team was coached by Bob Davie and played its home games at Notre Dame Stadium in South Bend, Indiana.

Schedule

Rankings

Roster

Season summary
With wins in their final five regular season games of 1997, the Irish started Davie's second season with confidence. Despite losing record-setting quarterback Ron Powlus, the Irish returned 14 starters, including tailback Autry Denson and three senior linebackers that were placed on the preliminary list for the Dick Butkus Award. Powlus was replaced by Jarious Jackson who had played sparingly in 1997 but had amassed almost 200 passing yards in the time. In Jackson's first start, against Michigan, he threw two touchdowns to lead the Irish, ranked 22nd, over the 5th ranked Wolverines. Denson added 162 yards and two touchdowns to give the Irish a 36–20 win. The Irish moved to tenth in the rankings, however didn't stay long, as Michigan State, who led by 39 points at halftime, beat the Irish for the second year in a row. Dropping back to 23rd in the nation, the Irish returned home to face Purdue. The Boilermakers handed the Irish their first loss in 1997 which dropped the Irish from the rankings, and the Irish looked for retribution in this game. With the Irish down two with less than two minutes remaining, Tony Driver, who was switched to cornerback in the offseason, intercepted a Drew Brees pass to set up the go-ahead field goal for the Irish. With the Boilermakers once again moving the ball, Driver had his second interception with less than a minute remaining to preserve the win for the Irish.

The Irish won all four of their October games, including a win over Stanford, a dominating win at Arizona State, a last minute win over Army, and a win over Baylor led by Denson's career high of 189 yards, to move back into the top-15 in the rankings. In the next game, the Boston College Eagles were poised for the upset of the Irish. Down 30–26, the Eagles had the ball on the Irish four-yard line with less than a minute remaining. The Irish defense, however, held the Eagles for four downs to preserve the win. The next week, led by Denson, who became the all-time leader in rushing yards at Notre Dame, the Irish shut-out Navy to increase their NCAA record winning streak over the Midshipmen to 35 games. Once again ranked tenth, the Irish faced LSU in their final home game. With a potential BCS berth on the line, and without Jackson, who was injured in the final play against LSU, the Irish traveled to face rivals USC in their final regular season game. Playing two backups at quarterback, including true freshman Arnaz Battle, the Irish were dominated by the tough Trojan defense that caused five turnovers. Though the Trojans, led by freshman quarterback Carson Palmer, couldn't produce much offense themselves, they only needed two scores to defeat the Irish 10–0. Wearing their alternate green jerseys for the first time since the 1995 Fiesta Bowl, the Irish got behind early to the Yellow Jackets with two long touchdowns. Though closing the gap to a touchdown in the fourth quarter, the Irish couldn't move the ball on their last two drives and lost their fourth straight bowl game. They finished the season with a 9–3 record and dropped to 22nd in the national rankings.

After the season, seven players were taken in the 1999 National Football League (NFL) Draft. Among them were Denson, who left with multiple Notre Dame rushing records, Malcolm Johnson, who left with a Notre Dame record of six consecutive games with a touchdown catch, and most of the offensive line starters. Also, offensive coordinator, Jim Colletto, was lured away to the NFL by Baltimore.

Michigan

at Michigan State

Purdue

Stanford

at Arizona State

Army

Baylor

at Boston College

vs Navy

LSU

at USC

Gator Bowl (vs Georgia Tech)

References

Notre Dame
Notre Dame Fighting Irish football seasons
Notre Dame Fighting Irish football